Vasanthathile Poomarangal (Flowering Trees of Spring; 2013), also published as Maoist, is a Malayalam novel written by Praveen under nom de guerre Roopesh. The novel is based on the report stating the presence of Maoists in Kerala. It narrates the activities of politicians and the interference of Police in this issue. It is authored by Roopesh, a political activist who is described as a Maoist.

The book was brought out by the two leading publishing companies in two different names. Kottayam-based DC Books has named the novel as Maoist while the title of the novel published by Thrissur-based Green Books is Vasanthathile Poomarangal.

References

Malayalam novels
Novels set in Kerala
DC Books books
2013 Indian novels
Works published under a pseudonym
Maoism in India